Podkovsky is a rural locality (a khutor) in Slashchyovskoye Rural Settlement, Kumylzhensky District, Volgograd Oblast, Russia. The population was 74 as of 2010. There are 2 streets.

Geography 
Podkovsky is located in forest steppe, on Khopyorsko-Buzulukskaya Plain, 41 km west of Kumylzhenskaya (the district's administrative centre) by road. Filin is the nearest rural locality.

References 

Rural localities in Kumylzhensky District